Brian Muir (born 15 April 1952) is a British sculptor who most famously created Darth Vader's helmet and armour using Ralph McQuarrie's design.

He was also responsible for sculpting the stormtrooper armour in Star Wars (the helmet was sculpted by Liz Moore) and the heads for the Death Star Droid, CZ3, and some finishing work on the C-3PO full suit.

Apart from Star Wars, he worked on over 70 other movies, including Alien (for which he co-created the Space Jockey) and Raiders of the Lost Ark (for which he worked on the Ark of the Covenant prop).

Autobiography
Brian Muir wrote an autobiography, In the Shadow of Vader, which was released on 19 December 2009. The book covers experiences encountered whilst working within the Film Industry. It is currently available through his eshop on https://www.brianmuirvadersculptor.com  
Following the success of his first book, In the Shadow of Vader, Brian decided to bring his incredible life story up to date by publishing his second book Beyond the Shadow. It chronicles the latter years of his impressive 48 year career as a film sculptor.

In July 2020 Brian, along with his wife Lindsay, has written and published their third and final book, Stormtroopers, The true story. A factual account of how the iconic Stormtroopers were created, which subsequently led to a high profile multimillion pound court case. With the endless controversy and conflicting stories reported in the media and on the internet, this book reveals the facts from the crew on the production in 1976.

Filmography 

 Alien
 Alexander
 A View to a Kill
 The Avengers
 Captain America: The First Avenger
 Captain Nemo and the Underwater City
 Clash of the Titans
 Crossed Swords
 The Curse of King Tut's Tomb
 Cutthroat Island
 The Dark Crystal
 Dark Shadows
 Die Another Day
 Dragonslayer
 The Eagle Has Landed
 The End of the Affair
 Erik the Viking
 Excalibur
 For Your Eyes Only
 Gangster No. 1
 GoldenEye
 Guardians of the Galaxy
 Hanover Street
 Harry Potter and the Deathly Hallows
 Harry Potter and the Half Blood Prince
 Harry Potter and the Order of the Phoenix
 Harry Potter and the Prisoner of Azkaban
 Indiana Jones and the Last Crusade
 Indiana Jones and the Temple of Doom
 John Carter
 Krull
 Lara Croft: Tomb Raider
 Lara Croft Tomb Raider: The Cradle of Life
 Link
 Little Shop of Horrors
 Loch Ness
 Lost in Space
 The Magical Legend of the Leprechauns
 The Martian Chronicles
 Mission: Impossible
 Mortal Kombat
 Nijinsky
 Octopussy
 Planet of the Apes
 Prince and the Pauper
 The Princess Bride
 Raiders of the Lost Ark
 The Railway Children
 Razor's Edge
 Return to Oz
 The Saint
 Sherlock Holmes II
 Silver Bears
 Sleepy Hollow
 Slipstream
 Snow White & the Huntsman
 Sphinx
 The Spy Who Loved Me
 Star Wars: Episode I – The Phantom Menace
 Star Wars Episode IV: A New Hope
 Superman
 Tomorrow Never Dies
 Up Pompeii
 Willow
 Young Sherlock Holmes

References

External links 
 Official website
 

1952 births
Living people
British sculptors
British male sculptors
British costume designers